James Kennedy (September 3, 1853 – November 9, 1928) was an American lawyer and politician who served as a U.S. Representative from Ohio for four terms from 1903 to 1911.

Early life and education 
Born in Lowellville, Ohio, Kennedy prepared for college at Poland Union Seminary, in Ohio, and graduated from Westminster College, New Wilmington, Pennsylvania, in 1876.  He studied law and was admitted to the bar in March 1879.

Political career 
Kennedy commenced to practice law in Youngstown, Ohio, where he also served as a member of the city council from April 1886 to November 1888. In 1894, he served as chairman of the Republican State convention at Steubenville, Ohio, in 1894.

Congress 
Kennedy was elected as a Republican to the Fifty-eighth and to the three succeeding Congresses (March 4, 1903 – March 3, 1911). He was an unsuccessful candidate for reelection in 1910, to the Sixty-second Congress. He resumed the practice of his profession in Youngstown.

Later career and death 
Kennedy became affiliated with the Democratic Party in 1916. He was an unsuccessful Democratic candidate for election in 1926, to the Seventieth Congress. He died in Youngstown on November 9, 1928, and was interred in Riverside Cemetery, Poland, Ohio.

Sources

1853 births
1928 deaths
Westminster College (Pennsylvania) alumni
Politicians from Youngstown, Ohio
Ohio Democrats
Ohio lawyers
Lawyers from Youngstown, Ohio
People from Mahoning County, Ohio
19th-century American lawyers
Republican Party members of the United States House of Representatives from Ohio